Louze, also spelt Loas, is a small village located near the district headquarters of Astore in Astore District. It has apple orchards, and a hydroelectric power station that supplies power to most parts of Astore.  The valley is used to grow a wide variety of apples, cherries, almonds, nuts and grapes.

Populated places in Astore District